Blu & Exile are an American hip hop duo, formed in 2007, composed of rapper Blu and hip hop producer Exile.

History
Blu and Exile first met in the mid-2000s while Blu was serving as a hype man for various hip hop groups including Slum Village, Platinum Pied Pipers, and Exile's own group, Emanon. He was personally introduced to Exile through Emanon's other member, Aloe Blacc. In 2007, Blu & Exile released their debut album, Below the Heavens, which was described by XXL as "one of 2007's most celebrated hip-hop releases". In 2012, the duo released their second album, Give Me My Flowers While I Can Still Smell Them. In 2017, the duo released In the Beginning: Before the Heavens, deleted tracks from Below the Heavens. Their next release, the True & Livin' EP was released May 24, 2019. On July 17, 2020, Blu & Exile released their third album, Miles: From An Interlude Called Life (or Miles for short), coinciding with the 13th anniversary of Below the Heavens.

Discography

Albums
 Below the Heavens (2007)
 Give Me My Flowers While I Can Still Smell Them (2012)
 Miles: From an Interlude Called Life (2020)

EPs
 Maybe One Day (2012)
 True & Livin (2019)

Compilation albums
 In the Beginning: Before the Heavens (2017)

References

External links
 

American musical duos
Hip hop duos
Hip hop groups from California
Musical groups established in 2007
Musical groups from Los Angeles